Arturo Roches is a Belizean politician. He is the Minister of State for Health in Belize.

References

Year of birth missing (living people)
Living people
United Democratic Party (Belize) politicians
Government ministers of Belize
Members of the Belize House of Representatives for Dangriga